KXBA (93.3 FM, "K-Bay 93.3 Classic Hits") is a commercial radio station in Nikiski, Alaska, broadcasting to the Kenai, Alaska area.

KXBA airs a classic hits music format.  It is owned by Peninsula Communications Inc.

References

External links
Official Facebook Page

XBA
Classic hits radio stations in the United States
Radio stations established in 1962
1962 establishments in Alaska